Cotehill is a village in Cumbria, England. In 1870-72 the township/chapelry had a population of 333.

See also

Cotehill railway station
Listed buildings in Wetheral

References

External links
 Cumbria County History Trust: Wetheral (nb: provisional research only – see Talk page)

Villages in Cumbria
Wetheral